Federal Hill is a mountain located in the Catskill Mountains of New York east-northeast of Delhi. Peck Hill is located southwest, Bryden Mountain is located east, and Boomhower Hill is located northeast of Federal Hill.

References

Mountains of Delaware County, New York
Mountains of New York (state)